Phryganopsis cinerella is a moth in the  subfamily Arctiinae. It was described by Wallengren in 1860. It is found in Kenya, Mozambique, Niger, Nigeria, Sierra Leone, South Africa and Zimbabwe.

References

Natural History Museum Lepidoptera generic names catalog

Moths described in 1860
Lithosiini
Moths of Sub-Saharan Africa